This is a list of television programs currently or formerly broadcast by Dubai One and its predecessors Ch33 and One TV. Titles are listed in alphabetical order.

News and current affairs 
 Dubai Eye on One (since 2020, simulcast from Dubai Eye 103.8)
 Emirates News (since 2006)
 DXB Today (since 2023)

Dramas and comedies

United States 
 18 Wheels of Justice
 Airwolf
 The A-Team
 Beauty and the Beast
 Benson
 Beverly Hills, 90210
 The Big Bang Theory
 The Bill Engvall Show
 Blood & Oil
 The Bold and the Beautiful
 Boy Meets World
 Brotherly Love
 City Guys
 Cleopatra 2525
 Close to Home (2009)
 Cobra
 The Colbys
 Cosby
 The Cowboys
 Curb Your Enthusiasm
 Dallas
 Dave's World
 Diff'rent Strokes
 Dinosaurs (TV series)
 Doogie Howser, M.D.
 Dr. Quinn, Medicine Woman
 Dynasty
 Early Edition
 Empty Nest
 Everwood
 Everybody Loves Raymond
 Falcon Crest
 The Flash
 The Fresh Prince of Bel-Air
 Friends
 Gilligan's Island
 The Golden Girls
 Gossip Girl
 The Gregory Hines Show
 Happy Hour
 Head of the Class
 Hercules: The Legendary Journeys
 Here and Now
 Home Improvement
 Hope & Faith
 Jack of All Trades
 The Jeffersons
 The King of Queens
 Knight Rider
 Knots Landing
 Life Goes On
 MacGyver
 Magnum, P.I.
 Malcolm & Eddie
 Manimal
 Melrose Place
 Murder, She Wrote
 The New Adventures of Old Christine
 Night Court
 Once Upon a Time
 Out of This World
 The Parent 'Hood
 Queen of Hearts
 Quantum Leap
 Red Band Society
 Reign
 Remington Steele
 Renegade
 Power Rangers
 Saved by the Bell
 Scarecrow and Mrs. King
 Seinfeld
 The Sinbad Show
 Sliders
 Smallville
 Small Wonder
 Smart Guy
 The Sopranos
 The Steve Harvey Show
 Street Hawk
 The Simpsons (2004–2005)
 Supernatural
 S.W.A.T.
 Team Knight Rider
 Teen Wolf
 Twin Peaks
 USA High
 Veronica Mars
 Walker, Texas Ranger
 The Whispers
 The Wonder Years

Other countries 
 Are You Afraid of the Dark?
 The Adventures of Sinbad
 Brazil Avenue
 Chakravartin Ashoka Samrat
 Dastaan-E-Mohabbat Salim Anarkali
 Doctor Who
 Due South
 Hey Dad..!
 Highlander: The Series
 Hustle
 İntikam
 Jhansi Ki Rani
 Jodha Akbar Keeping Up Appearances Kung Fu: The Legend Continues Mr. Bean Naagin Neighbours Razia Sultan Rossella Swarajya Janani Jijamata Swarajyarakshak Sambhaji Muhteşem Yüzyıl (aired under Hareem Al Sultan name)
 lacasa de pepel The Golden Horde Derecho a soñar Children's series 
 Animated series 
 1001 Nights 2 Stupid Dogs The Adventures of Blinky Bill The Adventures of Paddington Bear Adventures of Sonic the Hedgehog The Adventures of Super Mario Bros. 3 The Adventures of Teddy Ruxpin The Adventures of Tintin Aladdin The Amazing Adventures of Morph Andy Panda Animaniacs Angry Birds Toons Angry Birds Blues Angry Birds Stella Anne of Green Gables Ant-Man Arthur Avenger Penguins The Avengers: Earth's Mightiest Heroes Avengers Assemble Babar Baby Looney Tunes The Baby Huey Show Bad Dog Batman: The Animated Series Beany and Cecil Beethoven Beetlejuice Biker Mice from Mars Billy the Cat Bimble's Bucket Bionic Six BlackStar Blazing Dragons Bob Morane Bonkers Bucky O'Hare and the Toad Wars The Busy World of Richard Scarry Captain Planet and the Planeteers Challenge of the GoBots Channel Umptee-3 Chilly Willy Chip 'n Dale Rescue Rangers Count Duckula Creepy Crawlies Cro Danger Mouse Defenders of the Earth Dennis the Menace Dennis the Menace and Gnasher Denver, the Last Dinosaur Dink, the Little Dinosaur Dog City DragonFlyz Dr. Zitbag's Transylvania Pet Shop DuckTales Earthworm Jim ExoSquad Family Dog Fantastic Four Fantomcat Fat Albert and the Cosby Kids Fireman Sam Free Willy Fudge G.I. Joe: A Real American Hero Godzilla: The Series Go Go Gophers Goof Troop Gummi Bears Guardians of the Galaxy Hammerman The Hot Rod Dogs and Cool Car Cats Hulk and the Agents of S.M.A.S.H. Iron Man Jumanji Kampung Boy The Karate Kid Kid vs Kat Kimba the White Lion Kipper The Legends of Treasure Island Little Bear The Magician M.A.S.K. The Mask: The Animated Series Masha and the Bear Mighty Ducks Monster Force The Moomins Mortal Kombat: Defenders of the Realm The Mozart Band Mr. Bogus Mr. Hiccup My Little Pony My Little Pony Tales The Looney Tunes Show The New Adventures of Winnie the Pooh Oggy and the Cockroaches Oscar's Orchestra Pigeon Street Pingu The Pink Panther Pink Panther and Pals Piggy Tales Pippi Longstocking Police Academy Popeye and Son Popples Problem Child The Raggy Dolls ReBoot Redwall (TV series) (~2000)
 Road Rovers Robinson Sucroe The Rocky and Bullwinkle Show Roger Ramjet Rude Dog and the Dweebs Rupert Saber Rider and the Star Sheriffs Sandokan Savage Dragon Sharky and George Sky Commanders South Park Spider-Man Space Goofs Space Racers The Spooktacular New Adventures of Casper Spunky and Tadpole Stunt Dawgs The Super Mario Bros. Super Show! Super Mario World SuperTed The Centurions The Sylvester & Tweety Mysteries Taz-Mania Teenage Mutant Ninja Turtles Timon & Pumbaa Tiny Toon Adventures Tom & Jerry Kids The Transformers Ultimate Spider-Man Underdog The Legend of Calamity Jane The Magic Ball The Real Ghostbusters The Toothbrush Family The Undersea Adventures of Captain Nemo The Untouchables of Elliot Mouse Victor and Hugo Vor-Tech: Undercover Conversion Squad Where on Earth Is Carmen Sandiego? Widget, the World Watcher Wild West C.O.W.-Boys of Moo Mesa Wisdom of the Gnomes Wish Kid Where's Wally? Woody Woodpecker The Wuzzles Yo Yogi! Young Hercules Crocadoo Kim Possible (2004-2005)
 Poochini Sagwa, the Chinese Siamese Cat (2004-2005)

 Other series/shows 
 3-2-1 Contact Animal Shelf Art Attack Barney & Friends Beakman's World Bill Nye the Science Guy Brum Critter Gitters The Dooley and Pals Show Dynamo Duck Fraggle Rock Ghostwriter The Great Space Coaster Groundling Marsh Jay Jay the Jet Plane 
 Kratts' Creatures Let's Read... With Basil Brush Mr. Men Show Noddy's Toyland Adventures Oakie Doke Ocean Girl Polka Dot Shorts Pumuckl Ramona Sesame Street Size Small Skippy the Bush Kangaroo Space Cases Spellbinder Square One Television Sunshine Factory Super Gran Tales of the Tooth Fairies Theodore Tugboat Wimzie's House Wishbone Reality and game shows 
 America's Funniest Home Videos Blockbusters The Crystal Maze Zero Hour
 Fashion Star I Shouldn't Be Alive Give Us a Clue Pussycat Dolls Present Terror Towers What Would You Do? The X Factor Variety and lifestyle shows 
 Ask One (2010)
 Bonds for Life (2009)
 The Carol Burnett Show Emirates 24/7 (2010–2014)
 Chef Tell City Wrap (Ramadan 2011–2013)
 Dubai 101 (2009-2011)
 Dubai One Minute Emirati (2009)
 Healthy, Wealthy and Wise Guy in Dubai (2023-present, imported from Amazon Prime)
 Her Say (2010)
 Out & About This Week (2010-2014)
 Studio One (2011-2014)
 That's Entertainment (2011-2014)
 Twenty Something (2009-2011)
 Yan Can Cook World of Movies (2023-present)

 Others 
 2004 Zee Cine Awards
 Ripley's Believe It or Not! Understanding Islam (2011-2014)
 World of Sports''

See also 
 Dubai One
 Dubai Media Incorporated
 Television in the United Arab Emirates
 List of television programs

References

External links 
 

Dubai One original programming
Dubai One